Rudkhaneh Rural District is a rural district (dehestan) in Rudkhaneh District, Rudan County, Hormozgan Province, Iran. At the 2006 census, its population was 2,572, in 548 families.  The rural district has 21 villages.

References 

Rural Districts of Hormozgan Province
Rudan County